{{DISPLAYTITLE:Voltage-gated potassium-channel Kv1.4 IRES}}

This family represents the Kv1.4 voltage-gated potassium channel internal ribosome entry site (IRES). This region has been shown to mediate internal ribosome entry in cells derived from brain, heart, and skeletal muscle; tissues known to express Kv1.4 mRNA species.

References

External links 
 

Cis-regulatory RNA elements